Ali Kheyroddin (born 1962) is an Iranian researcher and Distinguished Professor of Structural Engineering at Semnan University.
He is also Deputy of Science and Technology at Iranian Ministry of Science, Research and Technology.
He is known for his works on reinforced concrete structures, nonlinear finite element analysis, tall buildings (analysis and design), composite structures, fiber-reinforced concrete, seismic retrofit, progressive collapse, and neural networks.

Books
 Lateral resisting systems in tall buildings
 Resilient construction material – science and applications
 Guide to Non-linear and performance analysis in Perform 3D V. 4
 Analysis and design of shear walls
 Loading in structures
 Strengthening of slab-column connections in flat slabs with FRP
 Nonlinear analysis of RC structures with finite element method
 Axial, shear and moment diagrams
 Computer Applications in Structural Engineering

References 

Living people
Iranian civil engineers
Academic staff of Semnan University
McGill University alumni
Iran University of Science and Technology alumni
1962 births
Distinguished professors in Iran